Boyer is a rural locality in the local government areas (LGA) of Brighton and Derwent Valley in the Hobart and South-east LGA regions of Tasmania. The 2016 census recorded a population of 40 for the state suburb of Boyer.
It is a town on the eastern side of the River Derwent, opposite and slightly downstream of New Norfolk.

History 
Boyer was gazetted as a locality in 1970.
It is named after a family who first settled in the area in the early 19th century.

Boyer is the site of Australian Newsprint Mills' plant in Tasmania, that commenced operations in 1941, the first mill in the world to utilise hardwood to produce newsprint, and has been recognised by Engineering Heritage Tasmania as a national engineering landmark. For many decades paper was shipped by tug and barge from the plant to the port of Hobart, Tasmania but all freight is now sent by road or rail.

Geography
The River Derwent forms the southern boundary.

Road infrastructure 
Route B10 (Boyer Road) passes through from east to west.

References

Towns in Tasmania
Localities of Derwent Valley Council
Localities of Brighton Council (Tasmania)